Cape Hatteras Secondary School is a public middle and high school in Buxton, on Cape Hatteras in Dare County, North Carolina. It is a part of Dare County Schools. It serves grades 6 through 12. Its attendance boundary includes areas in the county on islands south of the Oregon Inlet Bridge. This includes the census-designated places of Buxton, Avon, Frisco, Hatteras, Rodanthe, Salvo, and Waves.

History
An older set of buildings were built beginning in 1955, and by the mid-2000s Cape Hatteras Secondary was the oldest school structure in the school district. In 1993 Hurricane Emily flooded the building.

There was a single K-12 school, Cape Hatteras School, but it since 1997 was administratively divided into elementary and secondary divisions.

In 2003 Hurricane Isabel tore a channel between Hatteras and the school building, and therefore for a two-month period boats were used to transport students.

From 2005 to 2007 the district renovated portions and demolished others, spending a total of almost $30 million, far larger than the initial $5.3 million anticipated renovation. In 2007 it had about 350 students.

By 2019 the school was having a new media center built. Hurricane Dorian damaged the campus, with older portions generally more severely impacted. About $400,000 damage was done to the roof. The roof of the media center had been affected.

References

External links
 Cape Hatteras Secondary School

Public middle schools in North Carolina
Public high schools in North Carolina
Schools in Dare County, North Carolina